Gauriloff is a Skolt Saami surname originating in and around Suõʹnnʼjel, derived from the Skolt given name Kaurrâl, i.e. Gabriel. All total, 156 people, living or dead have had Gauriloff as their surname at some point in time.

Sometimes this spelling is also used in place of the Slavic surname Gavrilov.

Notable people with the surname include:

 Jaakko Gauriloff, a Skolt Sámi singer
 Katja Gauriloff, a Finnish-Skolt filmmaker and director
 Leo Gauriloff, a Skolt Sámi singer, guitarist and composer
 Matleena Fofonoff (née Gauriloff, b. 1949), Skolt master craftsman and artisan and recipient of the Skolt of the Year Award in 2009

See also
 Gavrilov

References

Sami-language surnames
Surnames from given names